In My Wildest Dreams is a 1992 album by keyboardist Tom Grant featuring David Grant and Wayne Braithwaite.

Track listing

Musicians

Tom Grant – Keyboards, Vocals
Phil Baker – Bass
Dan Balmer – Guitar
Wayne Brathwaite – Bass, Composer, Keyboards
Sharon Bryant – Vocals
Bruce Carter – Drums
James Clisset – Harmonica
Valerie Day – Percussion, Vocals
Diane Garisto – Background Vocals
Omar Hakim – Drums
George Howard – Sax (Soprano)
Bashiri Johnson – Percussion
Curtis King – Background Vocals
Marlon McClain – Guitar (Rhythm)
Danny Schauffler – Sax (Soprano), Sax (Tenor)
Terry Silverlight – Drums
Kirk Whalum – Sax (Soprano)

Production

Tom Grant – Producer, Programming
John Golden – Mastering
Michael Allaire – Engineer
Wayne Brathwaite – Producer, Programming
Eulis Cathey – Executive Producer
Guy Eckstine – Executive Producer
Douglas Durbrow – Engineer, Producer
James Clisset – Assistant Engineer
Mitchell Kanner – Art Direction
Anton Kimball – Illustrations

Track information and credits verified from the album's liner notes.

References

1992 albums